The Irish Premier League in season 2004–05 comprised 16 teams, and Glentoran won the championship. Omagh Town were relegated after finishing bottom of the table and subsequently dissolved on 7 June 2005 owing to financial problems. Crusaders were relegated after a 3-1 defeat on aggregate to Glenavon in the promotion play-off.

Before the start of the season Newry Town changed name to Newry City following the change in official status of Newry in 2002.

League standings

Results
Each team played every other team twice (home and away) for a total of 30 games.

Promotion/relegation play-off
Crusaders, the club that finished in the relegation play-off place, faced Glenavon, the runners-up of the 2004-05 Intermediate League First Division in a two-legged tie for a place in next season's Irish Premier League.

Glenavon won 3–2 on aggregate and were promoted, Crusaders were relegated.

References

NIFL Premiership seasons
1
Northern